Thomas von der Vring is a German politician. From 1979 to 1994 he served as a Member of the European Parliament (MEP), representing Germany for the Social Democratic Party. From 1989 to 1994 he served as Chair of the Committee on Budgets.

He went to school from 1943 to 1957. From 1957 to 1963 he studied history, sociology and national economy  in Munich and Frankfurt. In 1963 he graduated in Frankfurt.

References

1937 births
Living people
Politicians from Stuttgart
MEPs for Germany 1979–1984
MEPs for Germany 1984–1989
MEPs for Germany 1989–1994
Social Democratic Party of Germany MEPs